This is a list of Danish television related events from 2007.

Events
10 February - DQ is selected to represent Denmark at the 2007 Eurovision Song Contest with his song "Drama Queen". He is selected to be the thirty-fifth Danish Eurovision entry during Dansk Melodi Grand Prix held at the Forum Horsens in Horsens.
16 November - Kærlighed ved første hik actor Robert Hansen and his partner Marianne Eihilt win the fourth season of Vild med dans.

Debuts

Television shows

1990s
Hvem vil være millionær? (1999–present)

2000s
Klovn (2005-2009)
Vild med dans (2005–present)

Ending this year

Births

Deaths

See also
 2007 in Denmark